Australian state and territory issued identity photo cards (also known as Proof of Age Cards or by other names) are photo identification cards issued by the States and Territories of Australia.  While the drivers license is similar to the photo identity card, the photo identity card is treated separately here.

Summary 

While each state and territory has differing rules and laws concerning the issue of these cards, they all have a number of common features.  First they are issued by the government of the concerned state or territory to residents of that state or territory.  Second, they are voluntary - there is no requirement to hold the card, but there is a fee to obtain the card.  Third they are issued by and are closely associated with the state or territorial government agency responsible for the issuing of drivers licences, and are often similar to, produced on the same plastic as, and  maintained on the same systems as drivers licences.  They universally show the photo  of the individual, a signature, and their date of birth.  They are all credit card sized.  Finally, from 1 March 2017 all states and territories of Australia allow the issue of the card regardless of whether or not the holder has a drivers licence.

The following lists the different cards and the details.

Minimum age of 18 - some states allow application 1 month early for a delivery/pick up on or after the holder's 18th birthday.

Future purpose 
The photo card may become the de facto identity card once drivers licences become electronic, especially as some states such as NSW are encouraging the issue of such cards along with drivers licences at a nominal fee.

Document Verification Service 

The Attorney-General's Department provides a document verification service that allows for validation of some licences.

See also  
 Identity documents of Australia
 Australia Post Keypass identity card
 Driving licence in Australia

References

External links 
 Proof of Age Cards Australia

Identity documents of Australia